Ivin Jasper (May 14, 1970)  is an American football coach and former player. He is quarterbacks coach at the United States Naval Academy and has also spent time as the offensive coordinator for the school. He had been on the Navy football staff for the majority of his career. Jasper has also had coaching stops at the Naval Academy Preparatory School, Indiana State University, and Georgia Southern University.

Playing career
Jasper was a three-year letterman for the Hawaii Rainbow Warriors (1991–1993) at quarterback and slotback and helped lead Hawaii to a Western Athletic Conference title.

Coaching career
Following Jasper’s playing career at Hawaii, he coached the quarterbacks, fullbacks, and slotbacks at Navy for the 1995 and 1996 seasons.

In 1997, Jasper served as the offensive coordinator at the Naval Academy Prep School.

From there, He moved on to Indiana State as the offensive coordinator for the 1998 season.

Jasper spent three seasons, 1999 through 2001, as the quarterbacks and fullbacks coach. Here, he worked for Paul Johnson and helped the Eagles win two NCAA I-AA National Championships.

In 2002, Jasper returned to Navy as the quarterbacks coach. He became offensive coordinator prior to the 2008 football season. He was fired on September 11, 2021 after the second game of the season. 2 days later, he was reinstated as the quarterbacks coach.

Personal life
Jasper, a Los Angeles, California native, is a 1994 graduate of the University of Hawaii at Manoa where he earned his bachelor's degree in sociology/criminology. He and his wife, Donna, have three children. Their daughter, Dallas, played volleyball at Saint Leo University in St. Leo, Florida. Their oldest son, Jaylen, plays volleyball at Pepperdine University. Their youngest son, Jarren, is a freshman at Arizona State University . He had a heart transplant in January 2018.

References

External links
 Navy profile

1970 births
Living people
American football quarterbacks
Georgia Southern Eagles football coaches
Hawaii Rainbow Warriors football players
Indiana State Sycamores football coaches
Navy Midshipmen football coaches
High school football coaches in Rhode Island
Coaches of American football from California
Players of American football from Los Angeles
Sports coaches from Los Angeles
African-American coaches of American football
African-American players of American football
20th-century African-American sportspeople
21st-century African-American sportspeople